Diembéring is a rural community of Senegal in Cabrousse, Oussouye, Ziguinchor, Casamance. It is situated in the west of the country along the Atlantic coast.

Geography
There are several villages in Diembéring, including:

Boucott-Diembéring
Boucotte Diola
Cachouane
Cap Skirring
Carabane
Diembéring
Etama
Etoune
Haloudia
Houdiabousse
Kabrousse
Kadiakaye
Kaëngha
Nialou
Niéré
Nikine

Rural communities of Senegal